Khaptagay (Xaptağay, lit. flat) is a rural locality (a selo), the only inhabited locality, and the administrative center of Khaptagaysky Rural Okrug of Megino-Kangalassky District in the Sakha Republic, Russia, located  from Mayya, the administrative center of the district, at the confluence of the Myla and Lena Rivers, near the mouth of the Tamma in the Lena, on the Amur–Yakutsk Mainline. Its population as of the 2010 Census was 1,004; down from 1,014 recorded in the 2002 Census.

Economy
The Tamginsky Ironworks operated in this area in 1735–1756. Nowadays, Khaptagay is an agricultural center, with the main aspects being cattle and horse breeding.

References

Notes

Sources
Official website of the Sakha Republic. Registry of the Administrative-Territorial Divisions of the Sakha Republic. Megino-Kangalassky District. 

Rural localities in Megino-Kangalassky District
